Katharina Mayberg (1925–2007) was a German film and television actress.

Partial filmography

 Gaspary's Sons (1948)
 The Murder Trial of Doctor Jordan (1949)
 The Marriage of Figaro (1949) - Barbarina
 Theodore the Goalkeeper (1950) - Carola
 Immortal Light (1951) - Perrins Tochter
 The Blue Star of the South (1951) - Nelitze
 Behind Monastery Walls (1952) - Kathrin
 Marriage for One Night (1953) - Anita
 Arena of Death (1953) - Manuela Moreno
 The Country Schoolmaster (1954) - Martha Detleffsen
 The Sweetest Fruits (1954) - Juanita
 Rose-Girl Resli (1954) - Christine Rohrbach
 The Beautiful Miller (1954) - Kat Dramberger
 They Were So Young (1954) - Felicia
 The Inn on the Lahn (1955) - Josefine, Kellnerin
 Klisura (1956) - Ajka
 The First Day of Spring (1956) - Bettina Morelli
 The Battalion in the Shadows (1957) - Carmen
 Mazurka der Liebe (1957) - Bronislawa
 The Dragon's Blood (1957) - Brunilde
 Doctor Crippen Lives (1958) - Maja, malaisische Studentin
 Immer die Radfahrer (1958) - 'Kätzchen' Beryl
 I'm Marrying the Director (1960) - Silvia Roscol
 Im Namen einer Mutter (1960) - Emmi, Strafgefangene
 Il carro armato dell'8 settembre (1960)
 Kauf dir einen bunten Luftballon (1961) - Ilona Berg
 Junge Leute brauchen Liebe (1961) - Fatme
 Mann im Schatten (1961) - Vera Valentin
 Auf Wiedersehen am blauen Meer (1962) - Frau Aldobandini
 Durchbruch Lok 234 (1963) - Frau Mielke
 Wilder Sex junger Mädchen (1972)
 The Rider on the White Horse (1978) - Magd Ann Grete

References

Bibliography

External links

1925 births
2007 deaths
German film actresses
German television actresses
Actresses from Hamburg